The Fields Medal is a prize awarded to two, three, or four mathematicians under 40 years of age at the International Congress of the International Mathematical Union (IMU), a meeting that takes place every four years. The name of the award honours the Canadian mathematician John Charles Fields.

The Fields Medal is regarded as one of the highest honors a mathematician can receive, and has been described as the Nobel Prize of Mathematics, although there are several major differences, including frequency of award, number of awards, age limits, monetary value, and award criteria. According to the annual Academic Excellence Survey by ARWU, the Fields Medal is consistently regarded as the top award in the field of mathematics worldwide, and in another reputation survey conducted by IREG in 2013–14, the Fields Medal came closely after the Abel Prize as the second most prestigious international award in mathematics.

The prize includes a monetary award which, since 2006, has been 15,000. Fields was instrumental in establishing the award, designing the medal himself, and funding the monetary component, though he died before it was established and his plan was overseen by John Lighton Synge.

The medal was first awarded in 1936 to Finnish mathematician Lars Ahlfors and American mathematician Jesse Douglas, and it has been awarded every four years since 1950. Its purpose is to give recognition and support to younger mathematical researchers who have made major contributions. In 2014, the Iranian mathematician Maryam Mirzakhani became the first female Fields Medallist. In all, 64 people have been awarded the Fields Medal.

The most recent group of Fields Medalists received their awards on 5 July 2022 in an online event which was live-streamed from Helsinki, Finland. It was originally meant to be held in Saint Petersburg, Russia, but was moved following the 2022 Russian invasion of Ukraine.

Conditions of the award
The Fields Medal has for a long time been regarded as the most prestigious award in the field of mathematics and is often described as the Nobel Prize of Mathematics. Unlike the Nobel Prize, the Fields Medal is only awarded every four years.  The Fields Medal also has an age limit: a recipient must be under age 40 on 1 January of the year in which the medal is awarded. The under-40 rule is based on Fields's desire that "while it was in recognition of work already done, it was at the same time intended to be an encouragement for further achievement on the part of the recipients and a stimulus to renewed effort on the part of others." Moreover, an individual can only be awarded one Fields Medal; winners are ineligible to be awarded future medals.

First awarded in 1936, 64 people have won the medal as of 2022. With the exception of two PhD holders in physics (Edward Witten and Martin Hairer), only people with a PhD in mathematics have won the medal.

List of Fields medalists
In certain years, the Fields medalists have been officially cited for particular mathematical achievements, while in other years such specificities have not been given. However, in every year that the medal has been awarded, noted mathematicians have lectured at the International Congress of Mathematicians on each medalist's body of work. In the following table, official citations are quoted when possible (namely for the years 1958, 1998, and every year since 2006). For the other years through 1986, summaries of the ICM lectures, as written by Donald Albers, Gerald L. Alexanderson, and Constance Reid, are quoted. In the remaining years (1990, 1994, and 2002), part of the text of the ICM lecture itself has been quoted.

Landmarks
The medal was first awarded in 1936 to the Finnish mathematician Lars Ahlfors and the American mathematician Jesse Douglas, and it has been awarded every four years since 1950. Its purpose is to give recognition and support to younger mathematical researchers who have made major contributions.

In 1954, Jean-Pierre Serre became the youngest winner of the Fields Medal, at 27. He retains this distinction.

In 1966, Alexander Grothendieck boycotted the ICM, held in Moscow, to protest Soviet military actions taking place in Eastern Europe. Léon Motchane, founder and director of the Institut des Hautes Études Scientifiques, attended and accepted Grothendieck's Fields Medal on his behalf.

In 1970, Sergei Novikov, because of restrictions placed on him by the Soviet government, was unable to travel to the congress in Nice to receive his medal.

In 1978, Grigory Margulis, because of restrictions placed on him by the Soviet government, was unable to travel to the congress in Helsinki to receive his medal. The award was accepted on his behalf by Jacques Tits, who said in his address: "I cannot but express my deep disappointment—no doubt shared by many people here—in the absence of Margulis from this ceremony. In view of the symbolic meaning of this city of Helsinki, I had indeed grounds to hope that I would have a chance at last to meet a mathematician whom I know only through his work and for whom I have the greatest respect and admiration."

In 1982, the congress was due to be held in Warsaw but had to be rescheduled to the next year, because of martial law introduced in Poland on 13 December 1981. The awards were announced at the ninth General Assembly of the IMU earlier in the year and awarded at the 1983 Warsaw congress.

In 1990, Edward Witten became the first physicist to win the award.

In 1998, at the ICM, Andrew Wiles was presented by the chair of the Fields Medal Committee, Yuri I. Manin, with the first-ever IMU silver plaque in recognition of his proof of Fermat's Last Theorem. Don Zagier referred to the plaque as a "quantized Fields Medal". Accounts of this award frequently make reference that at the time of the award Wiles was over the age limit for the Fields medal. Although Wiles was slightly over the age limit in 1994, he was thought to be a favorite to win the medal; however, a gap (later resolved by Taylor and Wiles) in the proof was found in 1993.

In 2006, Grigori Perelman, who proved the Poincaré conjecture, refused his Fields Medal and did not attend the congress.

In 2014, Maryam Mirzakhani became the first Iranian as well as the first woman to win the Fields Medal, and Artur Avila became the first South American and Manjul Bhargava became the first person of Indian origin to do so.

In 2022, Maryna Viazovska became the first Ukrainian to win the Fields Medal, and June Huh became the first person of Korean origin to do so.

Medal

The medal was designed by Canadian sculptor R. Tait McKenzie. It is made of 14KT gold, has a diameter of 63.5mm, and weighs 169g.

 On the obverse is Archimedes and a quote attributed to 1st century AD poet Manilius, which reads in Latin: "Transire suum pectus mundoque potiri" ("To surpass one's understanding and master the world"). The year number 1933 is written in Roman numerals and contains an error ("MCNXXXIII" rather than "MCMXXXIII"). In capital Greek letters the word ΑΡXIMHΔΟΥΣ, or "of Archimedes". 
 On the reverse is the inscription (in Latin):

 
 
 
 
 

Translation: "Mathematicians gathered from the entire world have awarded [understood but not written: 'this prize'] for outstanding writings."

In the background, there is the representation of Archimedes' tomb, with the carving illustrating his theorem On the Sphere and Cylinder, behind an olive branch.

The rim bears the name of the prizewinner.

Female recipients

The Fields Medal has had two female recipients, Maryam Mirzakhani from Iran in 2014, and Maryna Viazovska from Ukraine in 2022.

In popular culture

The Fields Medal gained some recognition in popular culture due to references in the 1997 film, Good Will Hunting. In the movie, Gerald Lambeau (Stellan Skarsgård) is an MIT professor who won the award prior to the events of the story. Throughout the film, references made to the award are meant to convey its prestige in the field.

See also

 Abel Prize
 Kyoto Prize
 List of prizes known as the Nobel or the highest honors of a field
 List of mathematics awards 
 Nevanlinna Prize
 Rolf Schock Prizes
 Turing Award
 Wolf Prize in Mathematics

References

Further reading

 
 
 .

External links

 
 Overview at britannica.com

 
Awards established in 1936
Awards with age limits
Mathematics awards